Bocas del Toro is the Spanish for "the bull's mouths" or "the bull's gulf". Bocas del Toro refers to many places in Panama. 

 Bocas Town, Bocas del Toro, a town and provincial capital on Isla Colon, Panama
 Bocas del Toro District, an administrative district in Bocas del Toro Province, Panama
 Bocas del Toro Province, a province in Panama
 Bocas del Toro "Isla Colón" International Airport, an airport in the town of Bocas del Toro
 Bocas del Toro Archipelago, a group of islands on the Caribbean coast of Panama